A simulated pregnancy is a deliberate attempt to create the impression of pregnancy.

It should not be confused with false pregnancy, where a person mistakenly believes that they are pregnant.

Techniques 
People who wish to look pregnant, generally for social, sexual, psychological or entertainment purposes, have the option of body suits and the like to wear under their clothes. It can be done by using pillows or pads, or light-weighing, small balls with a round shape to simulate a pregnant abdomen.

See also
 Couvade syndrome

References

Prosthetics
Human pregnancy